Sandra Day O’Connor High School (SDOHS), part of the Deer Valley Unified School District, is a public high school located just west of I-17 and north of Happy Valley Road in Phoenix, Arizona. The school had a 97.1% graduation rate in 2018.

The campus, which first opened in fall 2002, is named after former Supreme Court Justice Sandra Day O'Connor, who grew up in Arizona, served as an assistant attorney general, was member of the state senate, and eventually became the first woman appointed as a Supreme Court Justice.

Activities and academics
SDOHS offers a full complement of academics, AP/honors level courses, special education inclusion, fine arts, career and technical education, and technology courses to students in grades nine through twelve. A wide range of student activities and clubs are available to all students. The school offers music and theater programs that include as extracurricular activities the Eagle Pride marching band, a competition jazz band, and an orchestra. Competitive athletics for both young men and women are offered at the freshman, junior varsity and varsity levels.

SDOHS also offers an Air Force Junior Reserve Officer Training Corps (AFJROTC) program. This program has won back-to-back unit awards from 2009 up to the 2014 school year.

Athletics

 Badminton
 Baseball
 Basketball
 Cross country running
 Football
 Golf
 Hockey
 Marching band
 Soccer
 Softball
 Swimming
 Tennis
 Track and field
 Volleyball
 Wrestling

Notable alumni
 Jordin Sparks – Winner of American Idol season 6.
 Nolan Gorman – Third baseman drafted by the St. Louis Cardinals.
 Amy Bockerstette – Golfer and disabilities advocate.

See also
 List of school districts in Arizona
 List of high schools in Arizona

References

External links
 Sandra Day O'Connor High School
 Deer Valley Unified School District
 The Talon
 Eagle Pride Band

Public high schools in Arizona
High schools in Phoenix, Arizona
Educational institutions established in 2002
2002 establishments in Arizona